Hindawi or Hindavi can refer to:

Hindawi affair
Hindustani language (Hindi-Urdu), Central Indo-Aryan languages, or any language of the Hindi Belt
Something of, from, or related to Hind or Hindustan (another name of India)
Hindawi Programming System, a suite of open source Indic-text programming languages
Hindawi (publisher), publisher of open access journals

People
David Hindawi (born 1944), American software entrepreneur
Nezar Hindawi, Jordanian convicted for plotting to bomb an airplane
Khairi Al-Hindawi (1885–1957), Iraqi politician and poet
Khalil al-Hindawi (1906– 1976), Syrian writer and poet
Orion Hindawi (born 1980), American software entrepreneur

See also
Hindi (disambiguation)
Hindavi Swarajya

Arabic-language surnames